Dracontolestes is a genus of extinct insectivorous mammals in the family Mixodectidae. It is known only from a fragment of fossilized mandible found in Dragon Canyon, Utah.

Species 
There is only one known species in the genus, Dracontolestes aphantus.

References 

Prehistoric mammals of North America
Prehistoric placental genera